John Dalton is an American author. His first novel, Heaven Lake won the 2005 Sue Kaufman Prize from the American Academy of Arts and Letters and the  2004 Barnes & Noble Discover Award in Fiction.

Dalton grew up near St. Louis, Missouri, as the youngest of seven children. He lived for a time in Douliou City, Taiwan (the setting for his first novel) during the late 1980s and travelled extensively in mainland China and Asia. He attended the Iowa Writers' Workshop in the 1990s but has now returned to St. Louis where he lives with his wife and two daughters. He is the director of the MFA in Creative Writing at the University of Missouri – St. Louis.

Bibliography

Novels
Heaven Lake (2004)
The Inverted Forest (2011)

References

External links

Interview with John Dalton

Living people
21st-century American novelists
Writers from St. Louis
Iowa Writers' Workshop alumni
Year of birth missing (living people)
American expatriates in Taiwan
American male novelists
21st-century American male writers
Novelists from Missouri
University of Missouri–St. Louis faculty